Georgia Field Hockey Association (GFHA) promotes field hockey in Georgia, USA.
It organizes a club hockey competition each year that attracts teams from around the world.
The GFHA sends men's and women's teams to compete in tournaments around the country.

History
The GFHA was started by Nicolas Hammond and Kelly Brown in February 1991.
It started playing at local parks but now plays on artificial turf surfaces.

Atlanta Cup
The annual Atlanta Cup has included teams from
Barbados, Bermuda, Canada, England, Nigeria and Trinidad.
The first Atlanta Cup was in 1993 and was sponsored by Dannon. 
From 1993 to 1996, the tournament was known as the Dannon Atlanta International Cup.
There was no tournament from 1997 to 2000.
From 2001 to 2004, the tournament was known as the Atlanta International Cup.
Since 2005, it has been called the Atlanta Cup. There was no tournament in 2013 or 2014 as the field was being refurbished.

External links
 Georgia Field Hockey Association

Field hockey in the United States
Organizations established in 1991
1991 establishments in Georgia (U.S. state)